Tall Gavineh (also Romanized as Tall Gavīneh and Tol Gavīneh) is a village in Dorunak Rural District, Zeydun District, Behbahan County, Khuzestan Province, Iran. At the 2006 census, its population was 291, in 59 families.

References 

Populated places in Behbahan County